Dalston is a ward in the London Borough of Hackney. It roughly corresponds to the Dalston area of London. The ward has existed since the creation of the borough on 1 April 1965 and was first used in the 1964 elections. The boundaries of the ward from May 2014 are revised.

The population of this ward at the 2011 census was 14,727.

1965–1978
Dalston ward has existed since the creation of the London Borough of Hackney on 1 April 1965. It was first used in the 1964 elections, with an electorate of 7,914, returning three councillors.

1978–2002
There was a revision of ward boundaries in Hackney in 1978.

2002–2018
There was a revision of ward boundaries in Hackney in 2002.

It now forms part of the Hackney North and Stoke Newington constituency. Previously, the ward was split between the two Hackney constituencies, the other half being part of Hackney South and Shoreditch.

In 2001, Dalston ward had a total population of 10,722. This compares with the average ward population within the borough of 10,674.

Hackney Council elections, 2018 are due to take place on 3 May 2018, two councillors will be elected.

References

External links
 London Borough of Hackney list of constituencies and councillors.
 Labour Party profile of Sophie Linden.
 Labour Party profile of Angus Mulready-Jones.

Wards of the London Borough of Hackney
1965 establishments in England
Dalston